The Dunărea is a right tributary of the Danube in Romania. It flows into the Danube in the village Dunărea.

References

Rivers of Romania
Rivers of Constanța County